Christianity is the most widely professed religion in Tanzania. A 2010 Pew survey found 61.4 percent of respondents to be Christian, 35.2 percent to be Muslim, 1.8 percent to follow traditional African religions, 1.4 percent to be unaffiliated, and 0.1 percent to be Hindu. According to a 2015 study 27.7% of the population was Protestant and 25.6% was Catholic. These are also the figures in the CIA World Factbook though that also note that Zanzibar is almost entirely Muslim.  A 2008-09 Pew survey found that 51 percent Tanzanian Christians described themselves as Roman Catholic, and 44 percent described themselves as Protestant. Among Protestants, Lutherans (13 percent of Tanzanian Christians), Pentecostals (10 percent), Anglicans (10 percent), and adherents of African initiated churches (5 percent) dominate. The Eastern Orthodox Church claims an estimated 200,000 adherents in Tanzania.  The United Methodist Church claims 8,371 members in Tanzania 

A 2015 study estimates some 180,000 believers in Christ from a Muslim background living in the country, most of them Protestant.

See also
 Religion in Tanzania
 Evangelical Lutheran Church in Tanzania
 Anglican Church of Tanzania
 Catholic Church in Tanzania

References